William Batson may refer to:

 Captain Marvel (DC Comics), alter-ego of William "Billy" Batson
 William Batson (cricketer), English cricketer